Bristol Community Church (formerly the Bristol New Covenant Church) is a charismatic church located in Kingswood, Bristol, England.

History
The Bristol New Covenant Church was set up in 1984 by Dave Jones, a pastor from Bath; before its foundation some people from the area would travel to Bath City Church.  The name was changed to Bristol Community Church in the 1990s because the word "covenant" in its name appeared to be leading people to believe that the church was a cult.

The Church met at a number of different venues around the city before moving to its current home, Bourne Chapel in Two Mile Hill Road, Kingswood, a former Primitive Methodist building erected in 1873, which had previously been part of an underwear factory.

Bristol Community Church came to an end in 2012 following the conviction of one it's youth leaders for child sexual offenses. Senior leaders of the church initially attempted to cover up this abuse. Those same senior leaders have since set up a new Church - 'New Life Church' in Frenchay, Bristol.

See also
 Churches in Bristol

References

External links
 BCC official website
 Primitive Methodist & Bible Christian Churches, Bristol includes external and internal pictures of Bourne Chapel

Churches in Bristol
Christian organizations established in 1984
Charismatic and Pentecostal Christianity
Kingswood, South Gloucestershire
1984 establishments in England